The 1976 Rice Owls football team was an American football team that represented Rice University in the Southwest Conference during the 1976 NCAA Division I football season. In their first year under head coach Homer Rice, the team compiled a 3–8 record.

Schedule

References

Rice
Rice Owls football seasons
Rice Owls football